Chukotka may refer to:
Chukotka Autonomous Okrug, a federal subject of Russia
Chukotka, alternative name of the Chukchi Peninsula, eastmost peninsula of Asia in the Russian Far East
Chukotka Mountains
2509 Chukotka, an asteroid

See also
Chukotsky (disambiguation)
Chukchi (disambiguation)